Wagner Leonardo Calvelo de Souza (born 23 July 1999), known as Wagner Leonardo, is a Brazilian footballer who plays for Portuguese club Portimonense. Mainly a central defender, he can also play as a defensive midfielder.

Club career

Santos

Born in Praia Grande, São Paulo, Wagner joined Santos' youth setup in 2009 at the age of nine. In February 2019, after appearing in the year's Copa São Paulo de Futebol Júnior, he was promoted to the first team by manager Jorge Sampaoli.

Wagner made his first team debut on 7 March 2019, coming on as a second-half substitute for fellow youth graduate Gustavo Henrique in a 4–0 home routing of América-RN, for the year's Copa do Brasil. He made his Série A debut on 9 September of the following year, replacing Alex in a 3–1 home win against Atlético Mineiro.

Wagner made his Copa Libertadores debut on 20 October 2020, replacing Felipe Jonatan in a 2–1 home win against Defensa y Justicia. On 8 January 2021, he and teammate John tested positive for COVID-19.

On 2 April 2021, Wagner was loaned to Série B side Náutico for the season. He became a regular starter for the side, and scored his first goal on 26 April in a 2–2 Campeonato Pernambucano home draw against Afogados.

On 8 July 2021, Wagner was recalled by Santos. He scored his first goal for the club on 10 October, netting the winner in a 1–0 home success over Grêmio.

On 21 December 2021, Wagner moved to Fortaleza on loan until March 2023, with a buyout clause. The following 12 March, after failing to make an appearance with the club, he moved to Cruzeiro also in a temporary deal.

Portimonense
On 24 December 2022, Wagner terminated his contract with Santos and moved abroad with Portuguese side Portimonense.

Career statistics

Honours
Nautico
Campeonato Pernambucano: 2021

Cruzeiro
Campeonato Brasileiro Série B: 2022

References

External links
Santos FC profile 

1999 births
Living people
Footballers from São Paulo (state)
Brazilian footballers
Association football defenders
Campeonato Brasileiro Série A players
Campeonato Brasileiro Série B players
Primeira Liga players
Santos FC players
Clube Náutico Capibaribe players
Fortaleza Esporte Clube players
Cruzeiro Esporte Clube players
Portimonense S.C. players
Brazilian expatriate footballers
Brazilian expatriate sportspeople in Portugal
Expatriate footballers in Portugal
People from Praia Grande